Corybas abellianus, commonly known as the nodding helmet orchid, is a species of terrestrial orchid endemic to tropical north Queensland. It forms small colonies and has single heart-shaped, dark green leaf with a silvery white lower side and a reddish purple flower with a curved dorsal sepal.

Description 
The leaf is dark green with silvery white veins on the upper surface and reddish on the lower side. The labellum is much shorter than the dorsal sepal, smooth and has a whitish tip. Flowering occurs from February to May.

Taxonomy 
Corybas abellianus was first formally described in 1955 by Alick Dockrill and the description was published in The North Queensland Naturalist.

Distribution and habitat
The nodding helmet orchid grows in small groups in rainforest on the higher parts of the Atherton Tableland and as far south as Tully Falls near Ravenshoe.

References 

abellianus
Endemic orchids of Australia
Orchids of Queensland
Plants described in 1955